Daniel Gogarty (born 7 December 1996) is a Canadian professional soccer player who plays as a centre-back for Vaughan Azzurri in League1 Ontario.

University career
Gogarty attended York University, where he played for the men's soccer team for five seasons from 2014 to 2018, making a total of 68 appearances. With the Lions, he won two national championships in 2014 and 2015, along with four OUA conference championships in 2014, 2015, 2017, and 2018. In 2015, he was named player of the game in the championship final. In 2016, he was named a U SPORTS second-team All-Canadian and an OUA West first-team all-star, as York won the OUA silver medal. In 2017, he was named a U SPORTS first team All-Canadian and was once again an OUA West first-team all-star and was also team co-MVP. In 2018, he served as team captain, was named team MVP, and was an OUA West first-team all-star for the third consecutive year.

Club career
From 2014 to 2018, Gogarty played with Vaughan Azzurri in League1 Ontario. In 2014, he was named to the league's Young Stars XI. With Vaughan, he won the 2016 league championship.

In November 2018, Gogarty was drafted in the first round of the 2018 CPL–U Sports Draft, fourth overall, by York9 FC. On February 4, 2019, he officially signed his first professional contract with York ahead of the inaugural Canadian Premier League season. On April 27, 2019, he made his professional debut in the first-ever game in Canadian Premier League history, a 1–1 draw with Forge FC. He appeared in 22 matches for York, across all competitions. In November 2019, the club announced that Gogarty would not be returning for the 2020 season. Afterwards, he stepped away from the sport, pursuing opportunities in the fashion industry.

On April 23, 2022, he signed a short-term contract with Toronto FC II of MLS Next Pro. He made his debut the next day, starting against Columbus Crew 2.

Upon the conclusion of his deal with Toronto FC II, he returned to his former club Vaughan Azzurri in League1 Ontario.

References

External links

1996 births
Living people
Association football defenders
Canadian soccer players
Soccer players from Toronto
Sportspeople from Scarborough, Toronto
York United FC draft picks
York Lions soccer players
York United FC players
League1 Ontario players
Canadian Premier League players
Vaughan Azzurri players
Toronto FC II players
MLS Next Pro players